is a Japanese actor and impressionist. He graduated from Iwakura High School Commerce Department. After belonging to Production Ogi, he is now represented with Shimizu Agency.

Shimizu's father is Akira Shimizu, who is also an impressionist, and they first co-starred in the 18 March 2011 broadcast of Bakushō sokkuri monomane Kōhaku Uta Gassen Special (Fuji Television).

Biography
After enrolling Iwakura High School Commerce Department in 2006, Shimizu debuted as an actor in the Taiga drama Kōmyō ga Tsuji (NHK). He was a member of the school baseball team.

Shimizu's career as an impressionist began with his first appearance on Bakushō sokkuri monomane Kōhaku Uta Gassen Special (Fuji TV) in March 2011. In October of the same year, he won the All Star Geinōjin Uta ga umai Ōzakettei-sen Special (Fuji TV) championship.

Shimizu married a non-celebrity in May 2016. They gave birth to a girl in 8 November.

Shimizu was reported to have been caught gambling at an illegal gambling center with actor Kaname Endo in the photo weekly magazine Friday released on 10 February 2017. It was also announced that the musical Hana Gubijin in which it had been scheduled from March to April of that same year received his report.

On December 22, 2017, Shimizu was charged with illegal stimulant use after being reported to the police by an out-call prostitution service for drug use in October. He has been charged with a 3-year sentence with half to be commuted.

Impressions
Tsuyoshi Domoto (KinKi Kids)
Gackt
Masaharu Fukuyama
Yukio Hashi
Kiyoshi Hikawa
Kiyoshiro Imawano
Ryuichi Kawamura
Kenta Kiritani
Kentaro Kobuchi (Kobukuro)
Nobuteru Maeda (Tube)
Tsuyoshi Nagabuchi
Takanori Nishikawa (T.M. Revolution)
Akihito Okano (Porno Graffitti)
Kohei Otomo (Hound Dog)
Yutaka Ozaki
Kazutoshi Sakurai (Mr. Children)
Tetsuya Takeda
Kōji Tamaki
Hideaki Tokunaga

Filmography

TV dramas

TV variety

Films

Stage

Mobile websites

References

External links
 (Shimizu Agency) 
 (April 2012 – ) 
 (10 December 2015 – ) 

Japanese impressionists (entertainers)
Comedians from Tokyo
Male actors from Tokyo
21st-century Japanese male actors
1988 births
Living people